36C is the third studio album by the Canadian post-punk band Fifth Column, released in 1994 by K Records. The album cover features a photo of Jena von Brücker in a scene from the film The Yo-Yo Gang. The song "All Women Are Bitches"  has been covered and sampled by Lesbians on Ecstasy as "Bitschy" in 2004 and by Kids on TV in 2005.

A video for the song "Donna" was released the same year, directed by Friday Myers, and featuring members Caroline Azar, Beverly Breckenridge, and G.B. Jones, with guitarist Michelle Breslin and photographer Jena von Brucker in supporting roles.

Track listing

Personnel 
 Caroline Azar – vocals, keyboards
 Beverly Breckenridge – bass, background vocals
 Michelle Breslin – guitar, background vocals
 Jena von Brücker – photography, background vocal
 Torry Colichio – drums
 Donna Dresch – guitar
 G. B. Jones – guitar, drums, background vocals
 Don Pyle – drums
 Charles Salmon – guitar
 Joel Wasson – drums

References 

K Records albums
1994 albums
Fifth Column (band) albums